The Belgian railway line 37 is a railway line in Belgium connecting Liège to Aachen in Germany. Completed in 1843, the line runs 47.4 km in Belgium. and another 6.8 km in Germany. It is the first and oldest cross-border railway line worldwide. Since 2009, high speed trains running between Brussels and Aachen use the HSL 3 instead of the line 37 between Chênée and Hergenrath.

Stations
The main interchange stations on line 37 are:

Liège-Guillemins: to Brussels, Namur, Maastricht and Hasselt 
Verviers-Central: to Spa
Welkenraedt: to Eupen
Aachen Hbf: to Mönchengladbach, Düsseldorf and Cologne

References

37
Railway lines opened in 1842
3000 V DC railway electrification
1842 establishments in Belgium